Ischia di Castro is a  (municipality) in the Province of Viterbo in the Italian region of Latium, located about  northwest of Rome and about  northwest of Viterbo.

Ischia di Castro borders the following municipalities: Canino, Cellere, Farnese, Manciano, Pitigliano, Valentano.

It takes its name from the nearby Castro, a town destroyed by Papal forces in the 17th century. The town is home to the Ducal Palace, or Rocca, to whose project collaborated Antonio da Sangallo the Younger (also designer's of Castro's walls before its destruction). It was once a palace of the Farnese family.

References

Cities and towns in Lazio